DIPT can refer to:

 Diisopropyltryptamine, a psychedelic hallucinogenic drug
 Diisopropyl tartrate, a reagent for organic synthesis
 Diploma of Teaching, an educational qualification